Tarikuiyeh (also Romanized as Tārīkū’īyeh; also known as Bīd-e Shīrīn and Tārīkū) is a village in Sarduiyeh Rural District, Sarduiyeh District, Jiroft County, Kerman Province, Iran. At the 2006 census, its population was 41, in 6 families.

References 

Populated places in Jiroft County